Chuck Daly Lifetime Achievement Award is an annual award given by the National Basketball Coaches Association (NBCA) to a longtime NBA  coach's life in basketball and his "standard of integrity, competitive excellence and tireless promotion" of the game. The inaugural award winner was Tom Heinsohn. The award is named after former NBA head coach Chuck Daly.

Winners

Notes
Jack Ramsay, Bill Fitch, Pat Riley, Jerry Sloan, Tex Winter and Hubie Brown were inducted into the Naismith Memorial Basketball Hall of Fame as coaches. Ramsey was also inducted into the National Collegiate Basketball Hall of Fame as a coach.      
Tom Heinsohn and Lenny Wilkens were inducted into the Naismith Memorial Basketball Hall of Fame as players and coaches. They were also inducted into the National Collegiate Basketball Hall of Fame as players. 
 K. C. Jones was inducted into the Naismith Memorial Basketball Hall of Fame as a player. He also inducted into the National Collegiate Basketball Hall of Fame as a player. 
Four of these winners were named Top 10 Coaches in NBA History in 1996: Bill Fitch, Pat Riley, Lenny Wilkens and Jack Ramsay.
Six of these winners were named Top 15 Coaches in NBA History in 2022: Pat Riley, Lenny Wilkens, Jack Ramsay, Jerry Sloan, K. C. Jones and Larry Brown.

References

External links
Official website

Awards established in 2009
Basketball coaching awards in the United States
Lifetime achievement awards
National Basketball Association awards